Michael Samuel McAnenay (born 16 September 1966) is a Scottish former footballer, who played for Albion Rovers, Ottawa Intrepid, Hamilton Academical, Dumbarton and Alloa Athletic.

References

1966 births
Scottish footballers
Dumbarton F.C. players
Albion Rovers F.C. players
Hamilton Academical F.C. players
Alloa Athletic F.C. players
Scottish Football League players
Living people
Association football midfielders
Footballers from Glasgow
Ottawa Intrepid players